Marshall Sharon Shatz (born 1939) is an American historian and scholar of Russia.

Works 

 The Essential Works of Anarchism (1972, as editor)
 Soviet Dissent in Historical Perspective (1980)
 Signposts: A Collection of Articles on the Russian Intelligentsia (1986)
 Imperial Russia, 1700-1917: Essays in Honor of Marc Raeff (1988, as editor, with Ezra Mendelsohn)
 Jan Wacław Machajski. A Radical Critic of the Russian Intelligentsia and Socialism (1989)
 Vekhi/Landmarks (1994, as editor, with Judith E. Zimmerman)

Translations 
 Bakunin's Statism and Anarchy (1990)
 Kropotkin: The Conquest of Bread and Other Writings (1995)
 Kliuchevsky's A Course in Russian History: The Time of Catherine the Great (1997)
 Polunov's Russia in the Nineteenth Century: Autocracy, Reform and Social Change, 1814–1914 (2005)

References 

American historians
Harvard University alumni
Columbia University alumni
University of Massachusetts Boston faculty